The Climate of Colombia is characterized for being tropical and isothermal as a result of its geographical location near the Equator presenting variations within five natural regions and depending on the altitude, temperature, humidity, winds and rainfall. Each region maintains an average temperature throughout the year only presenting variables determined by precipitation during a rainy season caused by the Intertropical Convergence Zone.

Climate zones
The climates in Colombia are characterized for having tropical rainforests, savannas, steppes, deserts and mountain climate, mountain climate further divided into tierra caliente (hot land) tierra templada (temperate land) tierra fría (cold land), tierra helada (frozen land) and ''Páramo.
Sometimes the weather of Colombia is altered by the seasons in northern hemisphere, for example, from March to June, the weather is mild Spring, from June to August the weather is hot Summer, From September to December the weather is cool Autumn, and from December to March the weather is cold Winter. This happens very rarely, and it is usually a slight difference.

Tropical rainforest
 
The tropical rainforest climate is characterized by hot and high humidity climate along with heavy rainfall mostly present in the jungles of the Catatumbo, the Amazon river basin the central region of the Magdalena River, the Pacific coast, the paru and others.

Tropical savanna

Steppe

Tropical desert

Tropical mountain climate

Mountain climate is one of the unique features of the Andes, the Sierra Nevada de Santa Marta and other high altitude reliefs where climate is determined by elevation., a classification used in some countries but with variations in the classification of each floor.

Warm climate altitudinal zone

Climate in this step is characterized for its similarities with the equatorial and tropical plains, heavy rains and high temperatures. This altitudinal zone is present in the cities like Santa Marta, Neiva, Cali and Cúcuta.

Temperate climate altitudinal zone

This climate is a characteristic in the cities like Pereira, Armenia, Ibagué Popayán and Medellín.

Cold climate altitudinal zone

The Colombian capital city Bogotá is located within this altitudinal zone. Other cities like San Juan de Pasto and Tunja are in this location.

Páramo climate altitudinal zone

Colombia has one of the largest páramo areas in the world; the Sumapaz Páramo located in central Colombia, over the Andean Cordillera Oriental branch. In Colombia páramos are further classified as subpáramo, páramo and superpáramo. Most of the rivers in Colombia are born here since páramos tend to hold water from precipitations and deglaciations coming from the peaks.

Glacial climate altitudinal zone

Glaciers in Colombia began retreating in the 20th century due to global warming and are in danger of disappearing, if this occurs water supply would be scarce in the near future. Most of the glaciers are located in the Andes mountains and are inhabited by very few living species due to its severe weather.

References

External links
 Government of Colombia: Hydrology, Meteorology and Environmental Studies Institute IDEAM

Environment of Colombia
Colombia